Junior is a book written by actor Macaulay Culkin, published in 2006.

External links
Macaulay Culkin on Fame, Michael Jackson, and His First Novel Junior - New York Magazine
Powell's Books - Junior: A Novel by Macaulay Culkin

2006 American novels
American autobiographical novels